Oona Cliff is a north-facing rock and ice cliff, about 4 nautical miles (7 km) long, situated just northwest of Mount Walton in the Outback Nunataks. Mapped by United States Geological Survey (USGS) from surveys and U.S. Navy air photos, 1959–64. Named by Advisory Committee on Antarctic Names (US-ACAN) for Hain Oona, Estonian ionospheric physicist at South Pole Station, 1968.

Cliffs of Victoria Land
Pennell Coast